was a multi-use stadium in Fujiidera, Osaka, Japan. It was used mostly for baseball and was the home of the Kintetsu Buffaloes prior to the Osaka Dome opening in 1997. The stadium had a capacity of 32,000 people.  The stadium was built in 1928, and closed in 2005. The site has since been redeveloped, and is now the home of the elementary school branch of Shitennoji International Buddhist University.

See also
Fujiidera Station - Minami Osaka Line

External links
Stadium information

Defunct baseball venues in Japan
Osaka Kintetsu Buffaloes
Sports venues completed in 1928
Sports venues demolished in 2006
Sports venues in Osaka Prefecture
Fujiidera
1928 establishments in Japan
2006 disestablishments in Japan
Demolished buildings and structures in Japan